Edward Fant "Bull" Durham (August 17, 1907 – April 27, 1976) was a pitcher in Major League Baseball who played from 1929 to 1933 for the Boston Red Sox and Chicago White Sox. He was born in Chester, South Carolina.
 
In a five-season career, Durham posted a 29–44 record with 204 strikeouts and a 4.45 earned run average in 143 appearances, including 71 starts, 23 complete games, three shutouts, one save, and 641 innings pitched.
 
Durham died in Chester, South Carolina, at the age of 68.

References

External links
Baseball Reference

1907 births
1976 deaths
Major League Baseball pitchers
Boston Red Sox players
Chicago White Sox players
Baseball players from South Carolina